Fontan may refer to:

Geography 
Fontan, Alpes-Maritimes - a village and commune in southern France

Medicine 
Fontan procedure - an operation performed on the heart of those with some forms of congenital heart disease

People 
Élodie Fontan – French actress
Francis Fontan – French cardiothoracic surgeon who first performed the Fontan procedure
François Fontan – French politician
Victor Fontan – French cyclist